The Evans-Neuhart House is a historic house at 320 East 5th Street in Plainview, Arkansas.  It is a single-story wood-frame structure, with a gabled roof, weatherboard siding, and a foundation of brick piers and wooden beams, now covered with brick.  It has an L-shaped featuring original turned posts and a tongue-in-groove ceiling.  It was built about 1915, and is a prominent local surviving example of Folk Victorian architecture.

The house was listed on the National Register of Historic Places in 2014.

See also
National Register of Historic Places listings in Yell County, Arkansas

References

Houses on the National Register of Historic Places in Arkansas
National Register of Historic Places in Yell County, Arkansas
Houses completed in 1915
1915 establishments in Arkansas
Houses in Yell County, Arkansas
Folk Victorian architecture in the United States
Victorian architecture in Arkansas